Mustapha Tlili (Tunisian Arabic: مصطفى التليلي; born 17 October 1937 – 20 October 2017) was a Tunisian novelist.
Born in Fériana, Tunisia, Mustapha Tlili was educated at the Sorbonne and in the United States. He worked at the United Nations from 1967 to 1982.

Tlili died on 20 October 2017, aged 80.

Works
 La rage aux tripes [Visceral Anger], 1975
 Le bruit dort [The Noise Sleeps], 1978
 Gloire des sables [Glory of the Sands], 1982
 (ed. with Jacques Derrida) For Nelson Mandela, New York: Seaver Books, 1987
 La montagne du lion [Lion Mountain], Paris: Gallimard, 1988. Translated by Linda Coverdale as Lion Mountain, New York: Arcade Pub., 1990.

References

1937 births
2017 deaths
Tunisian novelists
Tunisian officials of the United Nations
Tunisian emigrants to the United States
People from Kasserine Governorate